Brampton GO Station is a railway station served by GO Transit and Via Rail, located at 27 Church Street West in downtown Brampton, Ontario, Canada.  It is directly connected to the Downtown Brampton Terminal which serves GO Transit and Brampton Transit buses.

History

Brampton station opened in 1856 as a part of the Grand Trunk Railway (GTR) line between Toronto and London.  The current station building was built in 1907.

The GTR was acquired by the Canadian National Railway (CN) in 1923, then in 1977 CN's passenger rail division was transferred to Via Rail.

GO Transit began serving the station in 1974 with the creation of the Georgetown line (now Kitchener Line).

A new second platform on the south side of the tracks was built 2009-2011 featuring a covered section, improved lighting and security systems as well as an automatic snow melting system.  Previously only the north track had been accessible to passenger trains with a tunnel underneath the track for passengers entering from Station Street/George Street North.

In July 2014 Metrolinx (GO Transit) purchased the station from CN for $2.5 million.

Overview
The station is wheelchair accessible and the building houses a waiting room and ticket sales. The train station is connected by a passenger tunnel to the Downtown Brampton Bus Terminal on the south side.

With growing commuter ridership, the station's parking lot is operating over its designed capacity, and cannot be extended because of its downtown location. Mount Pleasant GO Station opened in early 2005 to take some of the pressure off this station.

The trackage between Bramalea and Georgetown  is still owned by Canadian National and it is part of the railway's primary freight line across Ontario. This limits the number of passenger trains that can operate through Brampton.

Services
The GO Transit Kitchener line trains operate between Toronto Union Station and Kitchener, with many trips terminating in Mount Pleasant or Georgetown.  As of 2019, train service operates on weekdays only with up to 3 trains per hour in the peak direction, and one train per hour at other times.  On weekends, GO bus service operates to Toronto from the adjacent Brampton Bus Terminal. 

The GO train service starts at 5:46 and the final train leaves at 23:16.

Via Rail Corridor intercity trains operate west to Stratford, London, and Sarnia, and east to Toronto Union Station.

Between 1982 and 2004, Brampton was an intermediate stop on the International Limited, a joint Via Rail and Amtrak service between Chicago and Toronto.

The Downtown Brampton Terminal serves GO buses to Yorkdale, York Mills and Union stations in Toronto, Orangeville and Guelph, as well as Brampton Transit local buses.

Travellers can either buy E-Tickets from gotransit.com or tap their PRESTO cards for a discounted fare to the PRESTO Fare Payment Device. 

Go also allows travellers to purchase passes:

See also

 List of designated heritage railway stations of Canada

References

11. "https://tickets.gotransit.com/en-us/" 19 March 2023

12. "www.gotransit.com/en/trip-planning/scheduled-departures/station?stationCode=BR&stationName=Brampton%20GO&sharedLink=true" 19 March 2023

External links

GO Transit railway stations
Via Rail stations in Ontario
Railway stations in Brampton
Canadian National Railway stations in Ontario
Designated heritage railway stations in Ontario
Former Amtrak stations in Canada
Canadian Register of Historic Places in Ontario